Richmond Temperance and Literary Society Hall is a historic building located near Wagram, Scotland County, North Carolina. It was built in 1860, and is a small, one-story, one room, hexagonal brick building.  It was built for local temperance society meetings held through the end of the 19th century.  It was used as a school until the 1920s.  After 1959, it was restored for use as a museum.

It was added to the National Register of Historic Places in 1973.

References

External links
VisitNC website

History museums in North Carolina
Clubhouses on the National Register of Historic Places in North Carolina
Cultural infrastructure completed in 1860
Buildings and structures in Scotland County, North Carolina
National Register of Historic Places in Scotland County, North Carolina